Queen of the Wave is the fourth album by Pepe Deluxé, released on CD by Catskills in the UK on January 30, 2012, and digitally by Asthmatic Kitty Records in the US on January 31. The album's cover art and liner notes were designed by James Spectrum. It is styled as "an esoteric pop opera in three parts."

The band, now consisting of Finnish producer James Spectrum and Swedish composer Paul Malmström, released five album companions in conjunction with the album through their website, and also as a free iPad app.

The group has produced promotional videos for the album as well as the tracks "Go Supersonic," "In The Cave," and "A Night and a Day." The video for "Go Supersonic" was chosen as a staff pick on Vimeo.

All the profits from album sales were donated to the John Nurminen Foundation, specifically for the charity's Clean Baltic Sea project.

Reception

On the review aggregate site Metacritic, the album has a score of 70 out of 100, indicating "generally favorable reviews."

Alan Ranta of PopMatters gave the album a PopMatters Pick designation, proclaiming it to be "the most impressive album ever painstakingly assembled across space and time." Mixmag's Thomas Green praised the albums eccentricities, writing, "Pepe Deluxé’s fourth album makes Queen or Kanye’s madly eclectic sonic excesses look like a campfire strum-along." Ben Hogwood of musicOMH wrote that "anyone looking for a return to the good old days when albums were invested with tender loving care will want to hear it." Clash Music also gave the album a positive review, as Anna Wilson wrote, "Its cleverness and humour burst like springs from an overstuffed rococo couch. Splendidly indulgent."

On their 75 Best Albums of 2012 list, PopMatters ranked Queen of the Wave at #17.

Track listing

Personnel
The following people contributed to Queen of the Wave:
 James Spectrum - Engineer
 Paul Malmström - Synthesizer, Handclaps, Organ, Recorder, Harpsichord, Guitar, Horns, Tambourine, Bass, Violin, Cello, Clarinet, Harmonium, Piano, Glockenspiel, Flute, Triangle, Vibraphone, Harp
 Boi Crompton, Chris Cote, Johanna Försti, Lumimarja Wilenius, Sara Welling, Tuire Lukka - Vocals
 Miikka Paatelainen - Guitar, Bass, Balalaika, Bouzouki, Glockenspiel, Vibraphone
 Kai Hahto, Markku Reinikainen, Teppo Mäkynen - Drums
 Timo Lassy - Flute, Saxophone, Horns
 Kati Pirttimaa - Pipe Organ
 Jukka Eskola - Trumpet, French Horn
 Mikko Mustonen - Tuba, Trombone
 Jarmo Saari - Viola, Guitar

References

External links
 Asthmatic Kitty's Page on Pepe Deluxé
 

Pepe Deluxé albums
2012 albums
Concept albums
Rock operas